Center Township, Nebraska may refer to the following places in Nebraska:

 Center Township, Buffalo County, Nebraska
 Center Township, Butler County, Nebraska
 Center Township, Hall County, Nebraska
 Center Township, Phelps County, Nebraska
 Center Township, Saunders County, Nebraska

See also
Center Township (disambiguation)

Nebraska township disambiguation pages